Chathuranga Dikkumbura (born 18 May 1990) is a Sri Lankan cricketer. He made his Twenty20 debut for Bloomfield Cricket and Athletic Club in the 2018–19 SLC Twenty20 Tournament on 16 February 2019. He made his List A debut for Bloomfield Cricket and Athletic Club in the 2018–19 Premier Limited Overs Tournament on 8 March 2019.

References

External links
 

1990 births
Living people
Sri Lankan cricketers
Bloomfield Cricket and Athletic Club cricketers
Place of birth missing (living people)